In Triumph is the fifth album by Swedish rock band The Quill.

Track listing
"Keep The Circle Whole" – 3:34 
"Yeah" – 3:38 
"Slave/Master" – 5:02
"Broken Man" – 3:15
"Man in Mind" – 4:22
"Merciless Room" – 4:40 
"Trespass" – 4:00 
"Black" – 5:07 
"No Light On The Dark Side" – 4:34 
"Triumph Is a Sea of Flame" – 4:52
"In the Shadows" – 4:22
"Down" – 6:46
Bonus: Broken Man (Video)

All songs written by Atlagic/Carlsson/Ekwall except "Broken Man" written by Atlagic/Carlsson/Ekwall/Triches

Personnel
 Magnus Ekwall - Vocals
 Christian Carlsson - Guitar
 Robert Triches - Bass
 George "Jolle" Atlagic - Drums

References

External links
 In Triumph at Encyclopaedia Metallum
 In Triumph at Discogs

2006 albums
The Quill (band) albums